Hendrik-Jozef Antonissen (9 June 1737 – 4 April 1794) was a Flemish painter of landscapes and cattle.

Life
Antonissen was born at Antwerp in 1737. He entered the studio of Balthazar Besohey in 1752–53, and three years later he was free of the Guild at Antwerp of which he was twice Dean. His works are mostly in private collections on the Continent. In the Stadel Gallery at Frankfort there is a Landscape with Cattle by him, signed and dated 1792. He died at Antwerp, in 1794. He had many pupils, including Balthasar Paul Ommeganck.

References

Sources
 

1737 births
1794 deaths
18th-century Flemish painters
Flemish landscape painters
Painters from Antwerp